"Nobody's Home" is a song by Australian musician Mallrat with Basenji. It was released on 1 February 2019. The song was certified gold in Australia in 2019 and platinum in June 2021. It placed at number 59 in Triple J's Hottest 100 of 2019.

Background
In an interview with Triple J discussing how the collaboration came about, Shaw stated: "We met early last year [2018] but I've been a fan of him for such a long time. I love the way he dresses, which is random to say, but it matches the way his music sounds; he pairs fun different things together." Shaw additionally stated that she frequently listens to Basenji's track "Can't Get Enough".

Critical reception
Laura English from Music Feeds said: "The new track has that infectious lyrical delivery that defines Mallrat's sound and has all these sweet, layered, little sounds that are arranged in a really cool way, courtesy of Basenji."

Mike Wass of Idolator described the track as an "understated electro-pop anthem" and stated it was "a winning addition to an already impressive discography."

Track listing

Certifications

References

2019 singles
2019 songs
Mallrat songs
Basenji (producer) songs
Song recordings produced by Basenji (producer)
Songs written by Basenji (producer)
Songs written by Mallrat